The Alvin Weinberg Foundation was a registered UK charity, operating under the name Weinberg Next Nuclear, that campaigned for research and development into next-generation nuclear energy. In particular, it advocated advancement of Liquid Fluoride Thorium Reactor (LFTR) and other Molten Salt Reactor (MSR) technologies.

It was named for Dr Alvin M. Weinberg, Director of Oak Ridge National Laboratory between 1955–1973 and the main advocate of MSR development.

History
 September 2011: Launched at House of Lords.
 January 2014: Becomes a Registered Charity in England and Wales.
 May 2015: Stephen Tindale joins as Director.
 July 2017: The Weinberg Foundation dissolved.

People
 Baroness Worthington is trustee and patron.
 Stephen Tindale, who led Greenpeace in the UK from 2000 until 2005, was its last Director.

See also
 Thorium-based nuclear power
 Generation IV reactor
 Molten salt reactor
 Liquid fluoride thorium reactor

References

External links
 the-weinberg-foundation.org

Nuclear energy
Thorium
Energy security
Oak Ridge National Laboratory
Charities based in London